SKATS stands for Standard Korean Alphabet Transliteration System. It is also known as Korean Morse equivalents. Despite the name, SKATS is not a true transliteration system. SKATS maps the Hangul characters through Korean Morse code to the same codes in Morse code and back to their equivalents in the Latin script. Any phonetic correspondence between the Korean and Roman letters would be purely coincidental.

If a Korean Morse code operator were to transmit a Korean message in Morse, and an English-speaking Morse code operator heard the message, what they would write down is SKATS.
The advantage of SKATS is the letter-perfect accuracy in conveying the Korean message, something that would be lost with romanisations such as RR or McCune-Reischauer used. SKATS dates back to the days before Korean keyboards gained widespread acceptance, so it was a way for Westerners who knew Korean to accurately produce the Korean language on a typewriter or keyboard. The primary users of SKATS are government departments who are interested in letter-to-letter accuracy.

SKATS is not a cipher. When using SKATS it is important to remember not to read the letters as they sound in English, but to read them as its original sound in SKATS.

The letters are written left to right as in standard written English. The correct form is to put one space between syllables and two spaces between words, but this often varies from one user to another. Without the double spaces between words, word breaks are ambiguous. If the rules are strictly observed, a Korean text written in SKATS could be perfectly recovered.

Double consonants and double or triple vowels are written the same way – each letter in the same order as if it were written in Hangul.

Sample sentence 

Morse:

 .-.. ..-  --   -.-. ..-   .-.. .     -- . --.   -.- ..- --. --.   -... . 

SKATS:

LUM CU LE  MEG KUGG BE

Letter-by-letter equivalent:

Hangul:

Revised romanisation:
Kimchiga masitta.

English:
The kimchi is delicious.

References

External links 
http://www.mykit.com/kor/ele/morse.htm

Hangul
Romanization of Korean
Morse code
Standards of South Korea